Dr. Michael A. Palese, is an American urologist specializing in robotic, laparoscopic and endoscopic surgery, with a special emphasis on robotic surgeries relating to kidney cancer and kidney stone disease.

Palese is the Chairman of the Department of Urology at the Mount Sinai Beth Israel.  He is a professor at the Icahn School of Medicine at Mount Sinai in New York City. He is also the Director of Minimally Invasive Surgery for the Mount Sinai Health System and specializes in robotic, laparoscopic and endoscopic surgery.

As a board-certified urologist and fellowship-trained surgeon, he specializes in the diagnosis and treatment of kidney, ureter, adrenal, bladder and prostate disease.

Palese performed the first robotic radical nephrectomy, robotic partial nephrectomy, robotic donor nephrectomy, robotic nephroureterectomy, robotic adrenalectomy, and robotic ureteral reimplant & reconstruction at the Mount Sinai Medical Center in New York City.  He holds several patents for the design of novel surgical devices.

He has been included in the Castle Connolly's List of America's “Top Doctors” in 2010, 2011, 2012, 2013, 2014, 2015, 2016, 2017, 2018 & 2019 and The New York Times publication of “Superdoctors” in 2009, 2010, 2011, 2012, 2013, 2014, 2015, 2016, 2017, 2018 & 
2019.

Biography
Palese graduated from Cornell University in 1993 with a double major degree as well as a minor degree in Human Biology. He received his medical degree (M.D.) from the Mount Sinai School of Medicine in 1997. He completed his general surgery and urology residency at the University of Maryland Medical Center and performed research at the Johns Hopkins Hospital, where he was a research resident. He finished a fellowship in robotic and laparoscopic surgery at Weill Cornell Medical College of Cornell University in 2004.

In 2004, Palese joined the Mount Sinai Medical Center where he established the robotic surgery program for the Department of Urology. He served as the Chief of Urology at the North General Hospital in New York City from 2004 to 2008.

Palese is on the Medical Advisory Board of the National Kidney Foundation of Greater New York and as a consultant for The Journal of Urology. He is on the steering committee for the Initiative on Kidney Cancer (sponsored by the National Kidney Foundation) and serves on the Medical Advisory Board to the New York Giants. He is a member of the American Medical Association (AMA), the American Urological Association (AUA), the New York section of the American Urological Association, and the Society of Laparoscopic Surgeons (SLS).

Professional activities, memberships and distinctions:
Palese is the author of book chapters and more than one hundred articles and abstracts.  He is on the Medical Advisory Board of the National Kidney Foundation of Greater New York and is a reviewer and consultant for the periodicals of the Journal of Urology, Urology, Urologic Oncology and Journal of Endourology .  He is an Editor for the Urologic Oncology (Journal): Seminars and Original Investigations in the section of New Technologies.  He is on the steering committee for the Initiative on Kidney Cancer sponsored by the National Kidney Foundation.  He also serves on the Medical Advisory Board to the New York Giants.  He is a member of multiple organizations including the American Medical Association (AMA), the American Urological Association (AUA), the New York Section of the American Urological Association and the Society of Laparoscopic Surgeons (SLS).

Palese lectures and presents his clinical research at national and international medical conferences.  As a Visiting Professor he has performed live surgery and given clinical talks in the United States, Austria, Argentina, Canada, Chile, France, Germany, India, Italy, Japan, Poland, Portugal, Spain, and the United Arab Emirates.  He teaches and mentors college students, medical students, residents and fellows.  He is a course director and faculty member for several educational courses to teach urologists and other physicians.  In particular he is a faculty member for the annual Basic Laparoscopy Course sponsored by the American Urological Association in Houston, Texas.  He has been a guest faculty member for Laparoscopy Courses in Buenos Aires, Argentina.  He has also been the Course Director for several robotic surgery and advanced prostate courses
& workshops held at Mount Sinai.  He has been featured in the news media on multiple occasions including the New York Times, Wall Street Journal, New York Daily News, CBS, CNN and WPIX TV.

Palese is included in the Castle Connolly Medical LTD America's Top Doctors and Top Doctor for Cancer edition, The New York Times published Superdoctors and the New York magazine's annual Top Doctors issue.

Board Certification
American Board of Urology

Honors and awards
America's Top Doctor: Castle Connolly Medical LTD - 2019 (17th Edition), 2018 (16th Edition), 2017 (15th Edition), 2016 (14th Edition), 2015 (14th Edition), 2014 (13th Edition)
America's Top Doctor for Cancer: Castle Connolly Medical LTD - 2019 (14th Edition), 2018 (13th Edition), 2017 (12th Edition), 2016 (11th Edition), 2015 (10th Edition), 2014 (9th Edition)
Super Doctors of New York (The New York Times) -2019, 2018, 2017, 2016, 2015, 2014, 2013, 2012, 2011, 2010, 2009
New York Magazine: Top Doctors -2019, 2018, 2017, 2016, 2015, 2014, 2013, 2012, 2011
New York Metro Area Top Doctor: Castle Connolly Medical LTD - 2019 (22nd Edition), 2018 (21st Edition), 2017 (20th Edition), 2016 (19th Edition), 2015 (18th Edition), 2014 (17th Edition), 2013 (16th Edition), 2012 (15th Edition), 2011 (14th Edition), 2010 (13th Edition)
Guide to America's Top Surgeon -2019, 2018, 2017, 2016, 2015, 2014, 2013, 2012, 2011, 2010, 2009, 2008, 2007
Best Doctors in America -2019, 2018, 2017, 2016, 2015, 2014, 2013, 2012, 2011, 2010, 2009, 2008, 2007, 2006, 2005
Cornell University Extern Program Sponsor 2008-2017
Best Video/Multispecialty: Society of Laparoendoscopic Surgeons (SLS) 2014
Best Video/Urology: Society of Laparoendoscopic Surgeons (SLS) 2014
Best Poster Presentation: Society of Laparoendoscopic Surgeons (SLS) 2014
Best Video/Multispecialty: Society of Laparoendoscopic Surgeons (SLS) 2012
Best Reviewer Award - Journal of Urology (Kidney Section) 2011
Best Video/ Urology: Society of Laparoendoscopic Surgeons (SLS) 2005
Fellow; American College of Surgeons (ACS) 2004
Resident Achievement Award: Society of Laparoendoscopic Surgeons (SLS) 2003
Pfizer Scholar Award and Grant 2003
Gerald P. Murphy Scholar 2003
Emil Tanagho Prize for Best Innovative Research; International Society for Sexual and Impotence Research (ISSIR) 2002
Sponseller Award for Excellence in Research 2002
National Kidney Foundation of Maryland Grant; (NKF) 2001-2002

Clinical trials
Current clinical trials include:
GCO 99-415. Tissue Banking of Prostate, Kidney, Bladder Tissue and Blood.
GCO 03–0962. A Randomized, Double-Blind, Placebo Controlled Phase 3 Trial of Immunotherapy with Autologous Antigen Presenting Cells Loaded with PA2024 (Provenge®, APC8015) in Men with Metastatic, Androgen Independent Prostatic Adenocarcinomas.
GCO 03-0962(2). An Open Label, Single Arm Trial of Immunotherapy with Autologous Antigen Presenting Cells Loaded with PA2024 (APC8015F) for Subjects With Objective Disease Progression and Disease-Related Pain on Trial D9902 Part B (PB01).
GCO 08–0813. A Randomized, Multicenter, Single Blind Study in Men with Metastic Androgen Independent Prostate Cancer to Evaluate Sipuleucel-T Manufactured with Different Concentrations of PA2024 Antigen (P07-2).
GCO 09–1509. An open label study of sipuleucel-T in men with castrate resistant prostate cancer.
GCO 10–0751. A Phase I Neoadjuvant Study of In-Situ REIC/Dkk-3 Gene Therapy Followed by Prostatectomy in Patients with High Risk of Localized Prostate Cancer (MTG-REIC-PC001).

Book chapters
Wedmid A and Palese MA.  Complications of Laparoscopic Donor Nephrectomy. Complications of Laparoscopic and Robotic Urologic Surgery. Springer, New York, 2010:127-142.
Palese MA, Del Pizzo JJ, Munver R and Poppas D. Robotic assisted adult and pediatric pyeloplasty. Textbook of Laparoscopic Urology. Informa Healthcare, New York, 2006:303-311.
Palese MA, Mulhall JP and Goldstein I.  Surgical treatments for vasculogenic erectile dysfunction. Atlas of Male Sexual Dysfunction.  Current Medicine LLC, Philadelphia, 2004:115-125.

Publications

References

External links
Mount Sinai Hospital homepage
Icahn School of Medicine at Mount Sinai homepage

Cornell University alumni
Living people
Icahn School of Medicine at Mount Sinai faculty
American urologists
Icahn School of Medicine at Mount Sinai alumni
Year of birth missing (living people)